Crimen entre bastidores is a 1948 Argentine crime thriller film directed by Francisco Peck.

Cast
 Samuel Sanda
 Nora Merlak
 Fernando Labat
 Raúl Wilson
 Fernando Aicardi
 Domingo Gussi
 Mara Balpi	
 Rafael Chumbito
 Nicolás Taricano

External links
 

1948 films
1940s Spanish-language films
Argentine black-and-white films
1940s crime thriller films
Argentine crime thriller films
1940s Argentine films